Md Aminul Haque Bhuyan (born  19 November 1952) is a Bangladeshi academic and the current Vice-chancellor of Bangladesh Islami University since  April 2022. He was the 9th Vice-chancellor of Shahjalal University of Science and Technology and of Z.H. Sikder University of Science & Technology, Shariatpur, Bangladesh.

Education and career
Bhuyan completed his master's degree and Ph.D. from the University of Dhaka. He earned the MCN (Master of Community Nutrition   ) degree from the University of Queensland.

Bhuyan was a faculty member of the University of Dhaka (former Professor and director) at the Institute of Nutrition and Food Science.

References

Living people
1952 births
People from Mymensingh District
University of Dhaka alumni
University of Queensland alumni
Academic staff of the University of Dhaka
Vice-Chancellors of Shahjalal University of Science and Technology
Vice-Chancellors of Bangladesh Islami University